Eumicrotremus pacificus, sometimes known as the spotted lumpsucker or the balloon lumpfish, is a species of lumpfish native to the Northwest Pacific. It can be found in the Sea of Okhotsk, the Sea of Japan, the East China Sea, and the Pacific Ocean off Hokkaido and the Kuril Islands. It may be confused with the closely related Eumicrotremus orbis, which overlaps with E. pacificus in range, although E. pacificus is larger, reaching 20 cm (7.9 inches) TL. This fish is generally yellow to orange in color with small dark spots and its tubercles are usually smaller and less pronounced than E. orbis, giving it a less spiny appearance.

References 

pacificus
Fish described in 1904